This article lists events that occurred during 1936 in Estonia.

Incumbents

Events
 Tallinn Technical Institute (later Tallinn University of Technology) is founded.
 Tallinn Airport was opened.

Births
24 October – Jüri Arrak, Estonian painter

Deaths

References

 
1930s in Estonia
Estonia
Estonia
Years of the 20th century in Estonia